Giants' tomb (Italian: Tomba dei giganti, Sardinian: Tumba de zigantes / gigantis) is the name given by local people and archaeologists to a type of Sardinian megalithic gallery grave built during the Bronze Age by the Nuragic civilization. They were collective tombs and can be found throughout Sardinia, with 800 being discovered there.

A stone cairn lies over the burial chambers, with some examples having a cup-shaped entrance similar to the court cairn tombs of Ireland.

Types

There are two general types of giants' tomb. In the so-called "slab type", uncut slabs are buried on end in the ground, and are arranged side-by-side. There is usually a central stele, which is the largest slab (up to 4 m in height) and has a doorway cut through it.

In the more primitive slab-type giants tombs, the central slab is unmodified aside from the entrance that is cut through it at the base, or else there is a crude dolmen-like arrangement of 3 uncut rocks to form the entrance (Osono, Sortali, Lolghi, Pescaredda). In more advanced slab-type giants tombs, the central slab is modified so as to be rounded on top, and has a simple design carved into the front surface (Dorgali, Goronna, Santu Bainzu, Coddu Vecchju).

The sepulchres have a characteristic rectangular plan with an apse. The burial chamber is usually 5 to 15 metres long and 1 to 2 metres high. The structures were originally covered by a mound resembling the shape of an overturned ship. Near the entrance an obelisk (betile in Sardinian) is usually found, which symbolizes the gods or ancestors who watched over the dead.

The so-called "block type" tombs are made of rectangular-cut blocks (Bidistili, Madau II, Seleni II, Iloi, Mura Cuata).

There are also structures similar to the block-type giants tombs on the island of Malta, in the United Kingdom and in Menorca (naveta)

List of major tombs
Su Mont'e s'Abe, near Olbia
Sa Dom'è s'Orcu, near Quartucciu
Two 18th-century BC tombs near Lanusei
Aiodda, near Nurallao
Coddu Vecchiu and Li Lolghi, Arzachena
Sa Dom'è s'Orcu, Siddi
Imbertighe, Borore
Madau, Fonni
Muraguada, Bauladu
Osono, near Triei
Tomb of San Cosimo, near Gonnosfanadiga
S'Ena'e Thomes, Dorgali
Bainzu, Borore
Sa Farch'e S'Artare, Seneghe

See also
Nuraghe
Naveta

Image gallery

References

External links

Giants' Tomb in Sardinian archaeology 

Buildings and structures in Sardinia
Archaeology of Sardinia
Archaeology of death
Burials in Sardinia
Burial monuments and structures
Megalithic monuments in Italy
Prehistoric sites in Italy
Tourist attractions in Sardinia
Archaeological sites in Sardinia